The 2014 FFA Cup was the inaugural season of the FFA Cup, the main national soccer knockout cup competition in Australia. 631 teams in total from around Australia entered the competition. Only 32 teams competed in the competition proper (round of 32), including the 10 A-League teams and 22 Football Federation Australia (FFA) member federation teams determined through individual state preliminary rounds held in early 2014 (and 2013 in the case of the ACT). The FFA Cup competition proper commenced on 29 July 2014 and concluded with the FFA Cup Final on 16 December 2014. which was brought forward from Australia Day in order to avoid a clash with the 2015 Asian Cup, which was hosted by Australia.

The winner of the FFA Cup received $50,000 as part of a total prize money pool of $131,450.

Round and dates

Prize fund

Preliminary rounds

621 FFA member federations teams competed in various state-based preliminary rounds to win one of 22 places in the competition proper (round of 32). Eight of the nine FFA member federations took part in the tournament, the exception being Northern Territory, which is expected to start participating from the 2015 season. Player registration numbers in each jurisdiction was used to determine the number of qualifying teams for each member federation:

 NSW have seven teams qualify.
 Queensland have four teams qualify.
 Victoria have four teams qualify.
 Northern NSW have two teams qualify.
 Western Australia have two teams qualify.
 ACT have one team qualify.
 South Australia have one team qualify.
 Tasmania have one team qualify.

The first of the preliminary rounds began on 6 April 2013 and the final of the preliminary rounds took place on 25 June 2014. Seven of the eight member federation preliminary rounds took place in 2014 (16 February–25 June). The exception was the ACT, whose competition took place during 2013 (6 April–28 August).

Teams
A total of 32 teams participated in the 2014 FFA Cup competition proper, ten of which came from the A-League, the remaining 22 teams from FFA member federations, as determined by the preliminary rounds. A-League clubs represent the highest level in the Australian league system, where as member federation clubs come from Level 2 and below. The current season tier of member federation clubs is shown in parentheses.

Draw
After the completion of the 2013–14 A-League season and the preliminary rounds by the respective member federations, the 32 teams were organised for the FFA Cup Round of 32 draw, the first of four draws in the competition proper. The draw for the round of 32 used three pots to arrange the teams: Pot A included the four A-League teams to reach the semi-finals in the 2013–14 A-League Finals series (Brisbane Roar, Central Coast Mariners, Melbourne Victory and Western Sydney Wanderers), Pot B included the remaining six A-League teams and Pot C contained the 22 member federation teams. Teams were drawn randomly into pre-determined positions. From the round of 16, Quarter-finals and Semi-finals, teams will be allocated in one of two pots. The remaining A-League teams were allocated to Pot A and the remaining member federation teams into Pot B. In each draw, teams were again drawn randomly into pre-determined positions.

The positions which teams are drawn into are structured to ensure that member federation teams have the best chance of advancing in the competition. The draw ensures a minimum of one non-A-League team reaches the Semi-finals stage, a minimum of three in the Quarter-finals and a minimum of nine in the round of 16. This structure is achieved by allocating teams (which are randomly drawn) into pre-determined positions, with some A-League teams guaranteed to be drawn against one another to ensure that a certain number of A-League teams are eliminated and that a certain number of member federation teams may progress in the tournament.

The draw for each round did not take place until after the scheduled completion of the previous round. The draws also determined which teams will play at home; that is, if a member federation team draws an A-League team, the member federation team will host the fixture. However, if two A-League teams or two member federation teams are drawn together, the first team drawn will host, with the exception that Wellington Phoenix must play all of their matches in Australia, away from home.

Bracket

Round of 32
The Round of 32 draw took place on Friday 27 June 2014. The lowest ranked sides that qualified for this round were Hakoah Sydney City East and South Springvale. They were the only level 4 teams left in the competition.

All times listed below are at AEST

Round of 16
The Round of 16 draw took place on Friday 22 August 2014. The lowest ranked side that qualified for this round was South Springvale. They were the only level 4 team left in the competition.

All times listed below are at AEST

Quarter-finals
The Quarter-final draw took place on 23 September, with all timing and venue details confirmed on 29 September. The lowest ranked sides that qualified for this round were Adelaide City, Bentleigh Greens and Palm Beach. They were the only level 2 teams left in the competition.

All times listed below are at AEDT

Semi-finals
The Semi-final draw took place on 31 October, with all timing and venue details confirmed on 5 November. The lowest ranked side that qualified for this round was Bentleigh Greens. They were the only level 2 team left in the competition.

All times listed below are at AEDT

Final

All times listed below are at AEDT

Top goalscorers

Broadcasting rights
The live television rights for the competition were held by the subscription channel Fox Sports, who broadcast the following 10 games live:

Match ball
The official match ball for the 2014 competition was the Umbro Neo 150 Elite.

References

External links
 Official website

FFA Cup
2014 in Australian soccer
Australia Cup seasons